Rajnikant Devidas Shroff, also known as Rajju Shroff is an Indian businessperson and billionaire, who is the founder and chairman of UPL Limited. In 2020, he was ranked as the #93 richest person in India, with a net worth of $1.5 billion, according to Forbes. The Government of India conferred him India's third highest civilian award the Padma Bhushan in 2021. Shroff is the only industrialist to receive Padma Bhushan in 2021. He is considered as the India's 'Crop Protection King'.

He was born in Kutch, Gujarat. He pioneered Red phosphorus manufacturing in India by setting up UPL Limited in Mumbai in 1969. He is Chemistry graduate from the Bombay University. He has been listed in the Forbes India's Tycoons of Tomorrow 2018.

In September 2018, Shroff received the Orden Mexicana del Águila Azteca (Mexican Order of the Aztec Eagle), the highest Mexican order awarded by the Mexican government to foreigners in recognition of outstanding services to Mexico or to humanity.

Awards and recognition 
 Padma Bhushan, by the Government of India, 2021
 Ranked #93 in the 2020 list of richest person in India by Forbes
 Forbes India's Tycoons of Tomorrow 2018
 Ernst & Young Entrepreneur of the Year Award, 2013
 Orden Mexicana del Águila Azteca by the Federal government of Mexico, 2018
 Lifetime Achievement Award by the Indian Chemical Council, 2010

See also 
 List of Padma Bhushan award recipients (2020–2029)

References 

Indian businesspeople
Indian billionaires
People from Gujarat
Living people
Recipients of the Padma Bhushan in trade and industry
University of Mumbai alumni
Year of birth missing (living people)